Enrico Tellini (25 August 1871 – 27 August 1923) was an Italian General whose assassination provoked the Corfu incident of 1923.

Biography
Enrico Tellini was born in Castelnuovo di Garfagnana in the province of Lucca in Tuscany. After a childhood in Florence and enlistment in the Italian army he enrolled in classes at a local military college in Florence. In 1901 he was promoted to the rank of major. He participated in the Italo-Turkish War and during the First World War held various posts until he was badly wounded and captured in the battle of Caporetto. After the end of the hostilities, he commanded Italian troops in Albania.

Assassination
In 1923, Tellini was part of an Italian delegation sent by the League of Nations to survey the disputed border between Greece and Albania. He was shot and killed, along with four companions, when the car he was driving in was stopped by a fallen tree across the road that ran along the disputed border near the town of Ioannina on the way to the Albanian border. The responsible persons were never found. The incident occurred close to the disputed border and could have been carried out by either side. However, the Italians under Benito Mussolini, blamed the Greek side. The Greek side refused any responsibility. The Italians claimed Greece as responsible and there were anti-Greek retaliations in the country. The Greek government denied responsibility and blamed Albanian bandits in the area. Benito Mussolini demanded 50 million lira in reparations from Greece and the execution of the assassins. On 31 August 1923 Italian troops occupied Corfu in the Corfu incident.

Reginald Leeper, the British ambassador at Athens in 1945, in a letter to the British Foreign Secretary in April 1945 mentioned that the Greeks that lived in Albania blame Cham Albanians for the murder of Tellini.

References

1871 births
1923 deaths
Military personnel from the Province of Lucca
Military personnel from Florence
Assassinated Italian people
Italian military personnel of World War I
Italian generals
Italian people murdered abroad
Mass murder victims
People murdered in Greece
Italian military personnel of the Italo-Turkish War
1923 murders in Greece